Piero Gadda Conti (13 February 1902 – 22 January 1999) was an Italian novelist and film critic.

Born in Milan, the cousin of Carlo Emilio Gadda, he debuted as a novelist in 1924 with L' estusiastica estate. He got his breakout in 1930 with the novel Mozzo, and in 1970 he won the Bagutta Prize with the novel La paura. A film critic for the magazine La Fiera Letteraria and for the newspaper Il Popolo, Gadda Conti was a jury member of the Venice Film Festival five times, in 1950, 1951, 1955, 1958, and 1963.

References

External links

1902 births
1999 deaths
Italian film critics
20th-century Italian people
20th-century Italian novelists
20th-century Italian male writers
Italian male novelists
Italian male non-fiction writers